Madan/Madaan is a surname. In India it is found among Punjabi  Aroras and Kashmiri Brahmins. Notable people with the surname include:

Arthur Cornwallis Madan, British linguist of African languages (Swahili and others)  and UMCA missionary (Zanzibar, Rhodesia), taught at Christ College
Falconer Madan (1851–1935), librarian of the Bodleian Library of Oxford University
Frances Maria Cowper (née Madan; sometimes known as Maria Frances; 1726-1797), British poet
Jamshed Madan (1915–1986), Indian cricketer
Jamshedji Framji Madan (1856–1923), Indian film and theatre magnate, one of the pioneers of film production in India
José Óscar Sánchez Madan (b. 1961), Cuban journalist
Judith Madan (1702–1781), English poet
Martin Madan (1726–1790), English barrister, clergyman and writer
Martin Madan (MP) (1700–1756), groom of the bedchamber to Frederick, Prince of Wales
Moti Lal Madan (b. 1939), Indian biotechnology researcher, veterinarian, academic and administrator
Spencer Madan (1729–1813), English churchman
Triloki Nath Madan (b. 1933), Indian academic
Sonya Madan, lead singer of Echobelly

Indian surnames
Surnames of Indian origin
Punjabi-language surnames
Kashmiri-language surnames
Hindu surnames
Brahmin communities
Khatri clans
Khatri surnames
Kashmiri people
Kashmiri tribes
Kashmiri Hindus
Kashmiri Pandits
Kashmiri Brahmins
Brahmin gotras